In This World is an album by saxophonist Mark Turner.

Background 
This was Turner's second album for Warner Bros. Records.

Music and recording
The album was recorded in June 1998. It contains six originals and three covers. "Mesa" "meanders from a relaxed melodic path to a switch-back road of surprises." Brad Mehldau plays electric piano instead of piano on three tracks. Two drummers – Brian Blade and Jorge Rossy – play together on two tracks. Guitarist Kurt Rosenwinkel plays on three tracks.

Track listing 
"Mesa" – 7:33 	
"Lennie Groove" – 7:18 	
"You Know I Care" – 8:02 	
"The Long Road" – 6:48 	
"Barcelona" – 6:45 	
"In This World" – 7:56 	
"Days of Wine and Roses" – 5:02 	
"Bo Brussels" – 4:45 	
"She Said, She Said" – 6:13

Personnel 
 Mark Turner – tenor saxophone
 Brad Mehldau – piano, electric piano
 Kurt Rosenwinkel – guitar
 Larry Grenadier – bass
 Brian Blade – drums
 Jorge Rossy – drums

References 

1998 albums
Warner Records albums
Mark Turner (musician) albums